Charles Everate Taylor (6 October 1884 – 13 June 1953) was an Australian rules footballer who played with Fitzroy in the Victorian Football League (VFL).

Notes

External links 

1884 births
1953 deaths
Australian rules footballers from Victoria (Australia)
Fitzroy Football Club players